Aaron John Waltke (born August 8, 1984) is an American screenwriter and Emmy-winning, Annie-nominated executive producer and showrunner. He is best known for his work on Guillermo del Toro's Trollhunters (2016–2018), Wizards: Tales of Arcadia (2020), Unikitty! (2018–2020), and Star Trek: Prodigy (2021–present). In 2020, he was named by  The College Magazine  as one of its "20 under 40" List.

Early life 
Aaron Waltke was born and raised in Greenwood, Indiana, in the suburbs of Indianapolis. He attended Indiana University Bloomington, where he majored in Psychology before changing his focus to Telecommunications, English and Theatre. While there, he began directing live theatre, performing sketch comedy, and writing screenplays. He eventually moved to Los Angeles where his work was shown at venues including The Upright Citizens Brigade Theatre, iO West, The Comedy Store, and the L.A. Comedy Shorts Film Festival.

Career

Film & Television 
Waltke began his television career producing and directing documentaries for PBS affiliate WTIU. After moving to Los Angeles, he was hired by The National Lampoon as a writer and producer to create original content for their online comedy and college television networks.

In 2012, he was hired to write a live-action feature film adaptation of The Brave Little Toaster. He was later hired to adapt a live action feature film version of the popular comic strip Heathcliff for the same company.

In 2014, he joined Guillermo del Toro's award-winning Netflix series Trollhunters produced by DreamWorks Animation, for which he was twice-nominated and won an Emmy Award in the category of "Best Writing for an Animated Program," and was nominated for an Annie Award. He later became co-executive producer and co-showrunner on the final installment of the franchise, Wizards: Tales of Arcadia, for which he co-wrote the pilot with del Toro, won a Kidscreen Award for "Best New Series" and was nominated for an Emmy for "Outstanding Children's Animated Series".

In 2017, he served as a head writer for a Cartoon Network spinoff of The LEGO Movie entitled Unikitty! produced by Warner Bros. Animation. While there, he co-wrote an episode of Teen Titans Go! for the same creative team.

In July 2019, Waltke joined the Paramount+ television series Star Trek: Prodigy as a writer and co-producer, later co-executive producer and co-head writer for the project, which marks the first CBS Studios and Nickelodeon co-production in the Star Trek franchise. He previously collaborated with the show's creators, The Hageman Brothers, on Trollhunters. In 2022, he was nominated for an Emmy Award for "Outstanding Animated Series" for his work on the show.

In October 2020, Legion M announced that Waltke was attached to develop and executive produce an adult animated feature film with Powerhouse Animation based on George Mann's Ghosts of Manhattan novels, an action sci-fi noir story set in an alternate history 1920s New York.

Personal life
Waltke is married to fellow writer and published mystery author Ellen Tremiti. They reside in Los Angeles.

Waltke engages in youth activism and outreach. He was the keynote speaker at the 2018 RESET Technology & Creativity Conference, a bi-national event between El Paso, Texas and Juárez, Mexico aimed at encouraging youth innovation, creativity, and opportunity across the Mexico-US border.

Selected filmography

Awards and nominations

References

External links 
  Aaron Waltke on Twitter

1984 births
American writers
American male screenwriters
Living people
Showrunners
American male television writers
21st-century American male writers
People from Greenwood, Indiana